The Niangara free-tailed bat or Niangara mops bat (Mops niangarae) is a species of bat in the family Molossidae known only from its holotype. It is endemic to Democratic Republic of the Congo. Its natural habitat is either moist tropical forest or savanna.

Taxonomy 
The holotype of the bat was collected in Niangara in northeastern DR Congo, near the border with Sudan. The species was initially called a subspecies of both M. trevori and M. congicus.  However, it was retained as an independent species following an assessment that indicated that the holotype's skull significantly differed from skulls of both M. trevori and congicus. The bat's taxonomic relationship with M. trevori is unclear.

Habitat and distribution 
The bat is only known to inhabit the DRC. It appears to roost in tree stumps.

Conservation 
Very little is known about the bat's habits, range, and population. Consequently, it is assessed as data-deficient.

References 

Bats of Africa
Mops (bat)
Mammals of the Democratic Republic of the Congo
Endemic fauna of the Democratic Republic of the Congo
Mammals described in 1917
Taxonomy articles created by Polbot
Taxa named by Joel Asaph Allen